Bohall Lake is a lake in Clearwater County, Minnesota, in the United States.

Bohall Lake was named for Henry Bohall, an assistant to Jacob V. Brower.

See also
List of lakes in Minnesota

References

Lakes of Minnesota
Lakes of Clearwater County, Minnesota